The Scania-Vabis L20/L60/L71 was a series of heavy duty trucks produced by Swedish automaker Scania-Vabis between 1946 and 1958.

Scania-Vabis L20 
Scania-Vabis’ first post-war model, the L10 had been introduced already in 1944. Two years later came the larger L20, with a six-cylinder variant of the company's module engine which had been introduced in the late 1930s. The truck was also offered with a trailing axle. This version was called the LS20, with an “S” for "support axle". The largest bogie vehicle had a payload capacity of 10.2 tonnes.

Scania-Vabis L60 
At the end of 1949, Scania-Vabis introduced a direct injected diesel development of their module engine. It had been designed in collaboration with British truck manufacturer Leyland Motors. With the new engine, the six-cylinder truck got its name changed to L60 and LS60 respectively. Otherwise the truck was mostly unchanged. In 1951 the old fashioned non-synchro four-speed gear box was replaced by a synchronized five-speed transmission.

Scania-Vabis L71 Regent 
In the spring of 1954 the final development of Scania-Vabis’ six-cylinder module engines were introduced, with larger displacement. The trucks were renamed L71/LS71 Regent and received air brakes. From the autumn of 1955 they could also be ordered with power steering.

Engines

Gallery

References

External links 

 Scania Group - history
 Swedish brass cars - picture gallery

L20
Vehicles introduced in 1946